Loché-sur-Indrois (literally Loché on Indrois) is a commune in the Indre-et-Loire department in central France.

Geography
The Indrois flows north through the commune and crosses the village.

Population

See also
Communes of the Indre-et-Loire department

References

Communes of Indre-et-Loire